"The Face Painter" is the 109th episode of NBC sitcom Seinfeld. It is the 23rd episode of the series's sixth season. It aired on May 11, 1995. The table reading for "The Face Painter" was held on March 26, 1995. In this episode, Jerry, Elaine, Kramer, and David Puddy go to two Stanley Cup playoff games, where Puddy dismays Elaine and an El Salvadoran priest with his rowdy displays of New Jersey Devils fandom. Meanwhile, Kramer holds a grudge against a chimpanzee who hit him with a banana peel, and George resolves to take the dramatic step of telling his girlfriend he loves her.

Plot
Elaine's boyfriend David Puddy, a New Jersey Devils fan, paints his face when he, Elaine, Jerry, and Kramer go to a Stanley Cup playoff game against the New York Rangers. After the game, his rowdy behavior and painted face make a priest believe that he has seen the devil. Jerry refuses to give a follow-up courtesy thank you to a friend, Alec Berg, for letting them use his season tickets. Later on at a funeral, Jerry sees Alec, but he gives an indifferent look, leading Jerry to wonder if it was because he didn't thank him and casting the possibility of their getting tickets to the next game in doubt. Elaine tells Puddy that she is breaking up with him because of his face-painting, but to her amazement, he offers to give up face-painting for her. Instead, he goes to the next game with his chest painted with the letter 'D' to spell out DEVILS with five other Devils fans.

Kramer finally persuades Jerry to call and give the courtesy thank you to Alec, but Alec has already given away the next playoff tickets to someone else. He instead passes on two tickets from a mutual friend of Puddy's who can't make it; Jerry and Kramer fill in as 'E' and 'V' with Puddy and his Devil fan friends. Elaine visits the priest to explain that it was Puddy he saw. She is wearing a white raincoat and the sun shines through a window behind her, leading the priest to believe she is the Virgin Mary come to escort him to the afterlife.

George tells his girlfriend Siena that he loves her, but she responds only "I'm hungry; let's get something to eat." He resigns himself to ending the relationship. Kramer has an altercation involving a banana peel with a chimpanzee named Barry at the zoo where Siena works. Barry becomes despondent and the zoo staff call Kramer in, asking him to apologize. He refuses since Barry incited the confrontation. When Siena ignores a remark made by Kramer, her co-worker informs Kramer that she doesn't hear well out of her left ear. Kramer passes the information on to George, who realizes that Siena may not have heard his profession of love. He tells her again in her right ear, but she says she indeed heard him the first time. Kramer at last apologizes to Barry, but the chimp responds by spitting water on him.

Production
Fred Stoller based Kramer's altercation with Barry the chimpanzee on a childhood visit to Monkey Jungle, during which he witnessed visitors throwing rocks at the monkeys. In the apology scene, a trainer was standing just off-camera to direct the chimpanzee's behavior.

In the original script, Kramer tells Jerry that if he no longer wants to be part of society, he should move to the bottle city of Kandor, continuing the series' tradition of Superman references. In the final draft Kandor was replaced by the East Side. The character Alec Berg was named after a Seinfeld writer.

George's story arc originally had an uncharacteristically serious ending for Seinfeld: After George tells Siena he loves her the second time, she responds, "I love you too." He then asks her to marry him, and she agrees. This ending was filmed but not used, though the idea of George becoming engaged was repurposed for the next season premiere.

Patrick Warburton and the New Jersey Devils
Patrick Warburton, who played David Puddy, grew up a fan of the Los Angeles Kings, but also acquired an affinity for the New Jersey Devils due to the episode. (He found himself with torn allegiances during the 2012 playoffs.) The season following "The Face Painter"'s broadcast, he was invited to drop the ceremonial first puck at a Devils game, and showed up with his face painted in the same way as Puddy's in the episode. After dropping the puck, he slipped and almost fell, but rescued the moment by regaining his balance and ripping off his shirt to reveal his chest was painted with the letter "D". This came to be regarded as an iconic moment in Devils history.

Warburton has often been invited to appear at Devils games with his face and chest painted, exhorting the crowd in a manner like that of his Seinfeld character. The Devils gave out a Puddy bobblehead doll to fans at a 2019 game.

Notes

References

External links 
 

Seinfeld (season 6) episodes
1995 American television episodes
Television episodes written by Larry David
Television episodes about funerals
New Jersey Devils
New York Rangers